Nadia Styger (born 11 December 1978, in Zug) is a former Swiss World Cup alpine ski racer.

Styger won a total of four Alpine Skiing World Cup races. She was several times Swiss champion in downhill and super-G. She won a bronze medal as part of the Swiss team at the FIS Alpine World Ski Championships in 2007 with Sandra Gini, Rabea Grand, Fabienne Suter, Daniel Albrecht and Marc Berthod.

World Cup victories

Footnotes

External links
 Official website
 News and related people on NamePedia

1978 births
Swiss female alpine skiers
Alpine skiers at the 2006 Winter Olympics
Alpine skiers at the 2010 Winter Olympics
Olympic alpine skiers of Switzerland¨
People from Zug
Sportspeople from the canton of Zug
Living people
21st-century Swiss women